Audrey Magazine, or also known as Audrey, was a publication focusing on Asian American women, published quarterly throughout the U.S.

History
The first issue of the magazine hit newsstands in March 2003. The magazine was named after the publisher's daughter to acknowledge that many Asian American women have English names.

Audrey covered Asians and Asian Americans in popular culture, fashion and beauty trends, lifestyle and travel, as well as social and cultural issues relevant to Asians and Asian Americans. Its sister publication was KoreAm. In its 10-year history, Audrey has been an important voice, covering stories well before the mainstream media picks them up, whether it is Asian plastic surgery, an emerging Asian American talent, or the K-pop craze. The magazine has featured Asian and Asian American celebrities on its cover, including Freida Pinto, Maggie Q and Olivia Munn. The magazine is based in Gardena, California. 

In 2006, Audrey also began to host the Audrey Fashion Show to feature Asian American fashion designers, models and artists. 

Audrey and its sister publication KoreAm were acquired by London Media Trust in 2014. The last print issues of the magazine and KoreAm were published in December 2015. 

In 2019, Audrey's sister publication KoreAm rebranded to Character Media, covering the latest in Asian American culture, entertainment and news.

Publication history

2003

2004

2005

2006

2007

2008

2009

2010

2011

2012

2013

2014

2015

See also 
KoreAm Journal

References

External links
 Audrey Magazine
 Online Editions

Bimonthly magazines published in the United States
News magazines published in the United States
Online magazines published in the United States
Asian-American magazines
Defunct women's magazines published in the United States
Magazines established in 2003
Magazines disestablished in 2015
Magazines published in California
Online magazines with defunct print editions
Women's fashion magazines